The Clatterbridge Cancer Centre (colloquially known as The Royal Cancer Hospital) is an NHS Foundation Trust, which specialises in the treatment of cancer. The centre is one of several specialist hospitals located within Merseyside; alongside Liverpool Heart and Chest Hospital, Alder Hey Children's Hospital, Liverpool Women's Hospital, and the Walton Centre.

Currently headquartered at Clatterbridge Health Park, Bebington, Wirral, the Trust operates an extensive network of services across Cheshire and Merseyside which includes their three sites in Liverpool, Wirral and Aintree, as well as clinics in hospitals across the region, and its team of specialist nurses who treat patients while they're at home or work.

History
In 1862 the Liverpool Hospital for Cancer and Diseases of the Skin was established. This hospital moved to a new site and became The Radium Institute and by 1901 was one of the two major radiotherapy centres in the North West of England.

In 1950s the organisation was renamed The Liverpool Clinic and in March 1958 moved to a new site near Clatterbridge, Wirral. The hospital had three wards and by 1959 was treating up to 80 patients per day on a Mullard 4 MeV linear accelerator. In the 1960s superficial x-ray equipment was introduced, along with a second linear accelerator in 1966 and two Cobalt-60 units.

In July 1972 the hospital was expanded to include outpatient departments, computerised radiotherapy planning facilities and medical records facilities. Between 1984 and 1987 the site was again expanded to include Computer Tomography, a gamma camera and The Douglas Cyclotron. In the 1990s these were followed by MRI facilities, a High Dose Rate afterloader and additional linear accelerators.

In 2011 the Trust opened a satellite hospital on the Aintree University Hospital campus to provide more convenient radiotherapy services to Liverpool.

On 1 April 2012 the trust changed its name from Clatterbridge Centre for Oncology NHS Foundation Trust (CCO) to The Clatterbirdge Cancer Centre NHS Foundation Trust (CCC).

In 2016 the Trust established a subsidiary company, Clatterbridge PropCare Services Ltd, to which 13 estates and facilities staff were transferred.   The intention was to achieve VAT benefits, as well as pay bill savings, by recruiting new staff on less expensive non-NHS contracts. VAT benefits arise because NHS trusts can only claim VAT back on a small subset of goods and services they buy. The Value Added Tax Act 1994 provides a mechanism through which NHS trusts can qualify for refunds on contracted out services.

In June 2020 the Trust opened a new 11-storey hospital building in Liverpool next to the Royal Liverpool University Hospital and University of Liverpool.

Hospitals
The Trust operates three sites across Merseyside, with a number of outpatient clinics hosted in other Trusts in the area.

Clatterbridge Cancer Centre - Wirral
The main base of the trust is located on the Wirral near Bebington. It provides a range of radiotherapy and chemotherapy services along with inpatient wards. The site hosts the only low energy proton therapy unit in the United Kingdom, which provides proton beam therapy for eye tumours.  One of the first NHS England funded community diagnostic centres in England is Clatterbridge Diagnostics, on the Wirral site, which offers tests for Phlebotomy, Ultrasound, MRI, CT, ECHO, ECG and Sleep Studies.

Clatterbridge Private Clinic
In June 2013, as part of a joint venture between the trust and Ireland's Mater Private Hospital, a private radiotherapy clinic was opened at the Clatterbridge Cancer Centre. The clinic provides chemotherapy, and radiotherapy treatments using a dedicated linear accelerator.

Maggie's Merseyside
In 2014 Maggie's Centres, a registered charity that provides support to anyone affected by cancer, opened Maggie's Merseyside centre.

Clatterbridge Cancer Centre - Aintree
Located on the campus of Aintree University Hospital, adjacent to The Walton Centre. The Clatterbridge Cancer Centre Aintree opened in 2011, as a radiotherapy satellite centre. At a cost of £17 million, the unit was partly funded by The Marina Dalglish Appeal. The Aintree facility provides Stereotactic Radiosurgery services in partnership with The Walton Centre.

Clatterbridge Cancer Centre - Liverpool
In 2008 a review was published into the provision of non-surgical oncology services within the Merseyside and Cheshire Cancer Network. In this review; its authors, Professor Mark Baker and Mr Roger Cannon, recommended that an inpatient cancer treatment facility be built in Liverpool. The Clatterbridge Cancer Centre Foundation Trust announced in 2011 that this recommendation was being actioned, and would take advantage of separate, but concurrent, plans for the redevelopment of the Royal Liverpool University Hospital. Approval to move forward with the plan for the new cancer hospital on West Derby Street, Liverpool was given by the eight local authorities in December 2014. This followed a public consultation, which ran from July 2014 to October 2014.

In October 2015, it was announced that the planned hospital will have 11 floors, and also include blood cancer treatment facilities. The Transforming Cancer Care project was projected to cost £155 million in total. This includes both the building and equipping of the new hospital, and refurbishing the Trust's Wirral cancer centre. It opened to inpatients on Saturday 27 June 2020 and outpatients were welcomed from Monday 29 June 2020.   It has 110 fully-single en-suite patient bedrooms and five radiotherapy Linac treatment suites.  Laing O'Rourke was the main contractor.

Satellite Centres
To enable patients located to the north and east of the River Mersey to receive more convenient access to cancer treatment, the centre operates a number of satellite centres and clinics within the Liverpool City Region and North West.

Broadgreen Hospital
Since 2010, the centre has run a nurse-led, day case chemotherapy clinic from a dedicated unit at Broadgreen Hospital. The unit treats lung, prostate and urological cancers.

Chemotherapy at home 
The Trust provides some chemotherapy in patients' own homes. Specialist chemotherapy nurses from The Clatterbridge Cancer Centre currently visit patients at home in certain areas of Merseyside and Cheshire to deliver trastuzumab (Herceptin). The Trust plans to expand the service to more areas and treatments.

The Countess of Chester Hospital
The trust provides some nursing staff to the Countess of Chester Hospital, allowing breast, bowel, lung and prostate cancer patients to be given chemotherapy on Haematology & Oncology unit.

Halton General Hospital
In 2009 the centre opened a chemotherapy centre at Warrington and Halton Hospitals NHS Foundation Trust's Halton General Hospital site to treat breast, bowel, lung, lymphoma, prostate and urological cancers.

The Linda McCartney Centre
The Linda McCartney Centre is located in a converted, former nursing college at the Royal Liverpool University Hospital. It provides services for patients with bowel and breast cancers.

The Liverpool Women's
The trust opened a unit dedicated to chemotherapy for gynaecological cancers at the Liverpool Women's Hospital, in February 2011.

The Marina Dalglish Centre
Treating breast, bowel, urology and lung cancers, The Marina Dalglish Centre was opened in 2007, having been converted from an old special care baby unit. Although this centre is also on the Aintree Hospitals campus, it is in a separate building to the Clatterbridge Cancer Centre Liverpool, which was built at a later date.

Southport Hospital
Following a £1.3 million renovation, the centre runs a nurse-led chemotherapy delivery service from Southport Hospital's Medical Day Unit, for bowel, breast and lung cancer patients.

St Helen's Hospital 
The Trust provides chemotherapy and oncology services in St Helen's Hospital.

Performance
It was named by the Health Service Journal as one of the top hundred NHS trusts to work for in 2015.  At that time it had 866 full-time equivalent staff and a sickness absence rate of 4.1%. 92% of staff recommend it as a place for treatment and 73% recommended it as a place to work.

In 2019 the trust was rated as good by the Care Quality Commission dropping from an outstanding rating in 2017.

See also
 List of hospitals in England
 List of NHS trusts
 Cancer in the United Kingdom

References

External links

 Transforming Cancer Care in Merseyside and Cheshire

Health in Cheshire
Medical and health organisations based in Merseyside
NHS foundation trusts
Cancer organisations based in the United Kingdom